The Final Conflict is an album by the British anarcho-punk band Conflict. It was released in 1988 by Mortarhate Records.

Track listing 
 "Countdown to Confrontation" – 2:36
 "Let the Battle Commence" – 2:19
 "I Heard a Rumour" – 3:15
 "The Cord Is Cut" – 2:11
 "Barricades and Broken Dreams" – 1:14
 "Do You Get the Picture?" – 1:38
 "The A Team" – 5:28
 "These Things Take Time" – 4:12
 "Radio Trash" – 3:30
 "The Final Conflict" – 5:47

References

Conflict (band) albums
1988 albums